Meral Yıldız Ali (born June 23, 1987 in Romania) is a Romanian-Turkish female table tennis player.

She plays for Fenerbahçe TT since 2007 and also played for Constanta TT in Romania and Eskişehir Anadolu University in Turkey.

Major achievements
3 times Turkish Champion
1 time Turkish Cup Winner
1 time Turkish Super League Champion
1 time Balkan Games Champion
1 time ETTU Cup Runner-up

References

External links
Player profile on fenerbahce.org
Team page on fenerbahce.org

1987 births
Living people
Turkish female table tennis players
Romanian female table tennis players
Fenerbahçe table tennis players
Turkish people of Romanian descent